This is a list  of Olympic broadcasters of the 2008 Summer Olympics. These games were the first to be produced and broadcast entirely in high-definition television. In their bid for the Olympic games in 2001, Beijing confirmed to the olympic evaluation commission "that there would be no restrictions on media reporting and movement of journalists up to and including the Olympic Games."
The host broadcasting organization of the games was BOB (Beijing Olympic Broadcasting). The home nation broadcasters are CCTV, CETV. CNR and other broadcasting stations in China with other languages which are broadcasting all competitions, events, galas and ceremonies with the Paralympics.

In Canada the public network CBC/Radio-Canada and cable networks TSN and RDS broadcast its final games before a private consortium involving CTV/Rogers/TQS takes over for the 2010 Winter Olympics, which will be happening within Canadian borders, in Vancouver. In Australia the Seven Network broadcast its final games before the Nine Network and Pay-TV operator Foxtel took over from the 2010 Winter Olympics and beyond.

The IOC awarded Australia's Seven Network the 'Golden Rings' award for "Best Olympic Programme". The award is given for the best overall Olympic coverage.

See also

 Olympics on television
 List of 2012 Summer Olympics broadcasters

Notes

Broadcasters
2008 Summer Olympics broadcasters
2008 Summer Olympics broadcasters
2008 Summer Olympics broadcasters
2008 Summer Olympics broadcasters